Căpățână or Căpățînă is a Romanian surname. Notable people with the surname include:

Chesarie Căpățână (1784–1846), Wallachian bishop
Eugen Căpățână (born 1986), Romanian rugby union footballer
Mihai Căpățînă (born 1995), Romanian footballer

Romanian-language surnames